The Main Event is a 2020 American sports comedy film directed by Jay Karas, from a screenplay by Larry Postel and starring Seth Carr, Tichina Arnold, Ken Marino and Adam Pally. It was released on April 10, 2020, by Netflix.

Plot

11-year-old Leo dreams of being a successful WWE wrestler. His Grandma Denise supports his love of wrestling. Leo's dad, Steve and Denise send him off to school and he rides his bike, where he meets up with his friends. They get bullied by another boy, a teacher intervenes and sends them all to the principal.

After school, the bullies confront and chase him on their bikes, but Leo manages to hide inside a house holding an estate sale. Inside, Leo finds a box with a wrestling mask inside. He takes it home after the man in charge gives him permission. On TV, he sees an ad for a WWE competition. Later, Leo overhears how his mom left his dad. Also his father needs to pay $20,000 for the mortgage to not lose the house.

Leo tries on the mask, discovering it transforms him: his voice deepens, he takes on a very strong personality and he has super strength. Doing a Google search, he finds the legend of the mask: only a genuinely deserving champion can use its powers.

Leo confronts his bullies, overpowering them using the mask. Erica, a girl he likes, is impressed and they become friends, but he is also punished and sent home from school. Leo decides to audition for the wrestling competition, wearing the mask. It comes down to him and wrestler Smooth Operator as the semi-finalists. Leo beats Smooth and reaches the final, against famous wrestler Samson.

Leo's fame begins to alienate his friends and Erica. He later realizes and confesses to Denise that he thought the mask would solve all of his problems, but things are only getting worse. Leo apologizes to his friends, and is forgiven.

Samson and his manager switch Leo's mask with a regular one. The competition begins, Steve watching on TV. Samson is brutally beating Leo, when Leo realizes the mask is a fake. Steve rushes to the match. Leo climbs up the cage around the ring to avoid Samson. Seeing Sampson is afraid of heights, he dares him to climb, causing him to pass out. Leo jumps down on him, officially winning the match.

Leo gets the $50,000 check and he asks them to pass the wrestling contract with NXT to Smooth, as he is only 11. WWE tells Leo when he is older, there will be a place for him in the organization. Two weeks later, Leo is on the school wrestling team. He has gained self-confidence without the mask and has the opportunity to wrestle his bully with his dad cheering him on from the audience.

Cast
 Seth Carr as Leo/Kid Chaos
 Tichina Arnold as Grandma Denise
 Ken Marino as Frankie
 Aryan Simhadri as Riyaz
 Momona Tamada as Erica
 Glen Gordon as Caleb
 Keith Lee as Smooth Operator
 Babatunde Aiyegbusi as Samson
 Josh Zaharia as Trevor
 Dallas Dupree Young as Mason
 Bodhi Sabongui as Luke
 Renee Paquette as Renee Young (herself)
 Matt Polinsky as Corey Graves (himself)
 Kofi Kingston as himself
 Sheamus as himself 
 Mike "The Miz" Mizanin as himself
 Lucie Guest as Ms. Cartwright
 Nikola Bogojevic as Stinkface
 Stephanie Bell as Lights Out Leslie

Production
In June 2019, it was announced that production on the film would begin that week in Vancouver. Moreover, it was announced that Seth Carr, Tichina Arnold, Ken Marino and Adam Pally would star in the film, with professional wrestlers Kofi Kingston, The Miz, Sheamus, Otis, Mia Yim and commentators Renee Young and Corey Graves also appearing.

Release
The Main Event was released on April 10, 2020 by Netflix.

Reception
On Metacritic, the film has a weighted average score of 52 out of 100, based on 8 critics, indicating "mixed or average reviews".

References

External links
 
 

2020 comedy films
2020s English-language films
2020s sports comedy films
American sports comedy films
English-language Netflix original films
Films scored by Photek
Films shot in Vancouver
Professional wrestling films
WWE Studios films
Films directed by Jay Karas
2020s American films